Aladdin is a brand notable for its line of character lunchboxes including Hopalong Cassady, Superman, Mickey Mouse and The Jetsons. Today, Aladdin continues to be a food and beverage products brand and is owned by Pacific Market International, LLC of Seattle, Washington and Aladdin continues to be a kerosene lamps and wicks products brand and is owned by Hattersley Aladdin Ltd of the United Kingdom.

Aladdin Industries
Aladdin Industries was a vendor of lunchboxes, kerosene lamps, stoves and thermal food storage containers. It was founded in Chicago in 1908 by Victor Samuel Johnson, Sr. and incorporated as the Mantle Lamp Company. Aladdin Industries was created as a subsidiary of Mantle Lamp Company in 1914, specifically to manufacture vacuum bottles. The company was further diversified under former president Johnson's leadership. It was the maker of the first character lunchbox, using images of Hopalong Cassidy, in 1950.

In 1908, Johnson Sr., a Chicago soap salesman, became interested in kerosene mantle burners. Dissatisfied with the available kerosene lamps of the time, Johnson began selling U.S.-made mantle lamps. He incorporated his lamp sales business and called the company the Mantle Lamp Company of America. In 1912, the company began manufacturing mantle lamps that gave off a steady white light without smoke. They called these lamps Aladdin lamps after the magical lamp and wish-granting genie in the children's story.

In 1917, Johnson Sr. diversified the company's offerings and began producing insulated cooking dishes, known at the time as Aladdin Thermalware jars. These Thermalware jars were the company's first venture into heat and cold retaining dishes and are early cousins of the products in use today. In 1919, Johnson moved these jars into a new subsidiary he called Aladdin Industries. This subsidiary offered thermalware jars and vacuum ware and successfully sold and manufactured these products from 1919-1943.

In 1943, Johnson Sr. died and his son Victor S. Johnson, Jr. took over as president of Aladdin Industries, Inc. In 1949, in an effort to centralize operations, Johnson Jr. moved Aladdin's offices and manufacturing facilities to Nashville, TN.

Under Johnson Jr.'s management, Aladdin began producing metal lunch boxes in the 1940s. By the 1950s Aladdin was an industry leader in this category and would remain so for the next 30 years. Aladdin's dominance in lunch products resulted from a strategic move in the early 50s to license popular character images on its products. Hopalong Cassidy was the first character licensed product and in its first year, sales went from 50,000 units to 600,000 units. Subsequent branding included Superman, Mickey Mouse and The Jetsons.

In 1965 Aladdin Industries expanded their product line through the acquisition of the Stanley Bottle operation. This move helped solidify the company's position in the food and beverage container category by deepening their line of steel offerings. 

In 1968, Aladdin introduced the insulated thermal tray, which revolutionized meal distribution for airlines, and then hospitals and other mass-feeding institutions which could, at last, keep hot foods hot and cold foods cold for long periods of time. Aladdin Industries incorporated Aladdin Synergetics as a new division for healthcare foodservice products. In 1998, this subsidiary was sold to Welbilt Corporation and was renamed Aladdin Temp-Rite. In 2002, Aladdin Temp-Rite was acquired by the Ali Group.

1980s – 2002
During the 1980s and 1990s Aladdin continued to grow and by the mid 1990s its Nashville operation grew to employ 1100 employees. At this time, foam insulated mugs grew in popularity and Aladdin's products were sold in grocery chains nationwide. Aladdin opened their Nashville factory on Murfreesboro Road, producing its first thermal products in July 2002.

Seattle-based company Pacific Market International, LLC purchased the Aladdin brand in 2002.

Current Aladdin brand
The Aladdin brand is now owned by the privately held Pacific Market International (PMI), and is headquartered in Seattle, Washington, with offices in Europe, Asia and Australia. As of 2009, PMI sell vacuum flasks and other thermal products manufactured under the Aladdin name.

Literary references
The protagonist in Penelope Fitzgerald's Booker prize shortlisted novel The Gate of Angels, set in 1912, uses one of the company's lamps (an "Aladdin") in the fictional college of St Angelicus, where the use of electricity or gas is not permitted.

See also 
Lunch box
Aladdin Industries
Stanley bottle

References

External links
Aladdin Industries from The Tennessee Encyclopedia of History and Culture
A History of Aladdin Lamps — TeriAnn's Guide to Aladdin Mantle Lamps

Manufacturing companies based in Seattle
Defunct manufacturing companies based in Tennessee
Manufacturing companies established in 1908
1908 establishments in Illinois
Manufacturing companies disestablished in 2002
2002 disestablishments in Tennessee
Vacuum flasks
American companies established in 1908